Swami Vivekananda Institute of Science and Technology, abbreviated as SVIST, is a private engineering institution in Kolkata, West Bengal, India which offers undergraduate(B.Tech) four-year engineering degree courses in five disciplines. The college is affiliated to Maulana Abul Kalam Azad University of Technology(MAKAUT).

See also

References

External links
 http://www.svist.org/
Maulana Abul Kalam Azad University of Technology

Engineering colleges in West Bengal
Universities and colleges in South 24 Parganas district
Colleges affiliated to West Bengal University of Technology
Educational institutions established in 2001
2001 establishments in West Bengal